Emmanuel Bor (born 14 April 1988) is a Kenyan-born American long-distance runner. He competed collegiately for the University of Alabama. His brothers Hillary and Julius have also been professional runners; however, Julius retired in 2018. After graduating college, Bor joined the US Army and currently competes with the World Class Athlete Program based in Fort Carson, Colorado.

Personal bests
Outdoor
800 metres – 1:51.64 (Gainesville 2009)
1500 metres – 3:41.65 (Bangkok 2007)
3000 metres – 7:52.58 (Eugene 2018)
Two miles – 8:23.96 (Eugene 2018)
5000 metres – 13:13.15 (Eugene 2022)
10,000 metres – 27:22.80 (Irvine 2021)
Half marathon – 1:02:46 (Pittsburgh 2014)
Marathon –	2:22:57 (Porto 2017)

Indoor
1500 metres – 3:50.72 (Albuquerque 2018)
Mile – 3:58.77 (Boston 2018)
3000 metres – 7:44.93 (Boston 2018)
5000 metres – 13:00.48 (Boston 2022)

References

1988 births
Living people
American male middle-distance runners
American male long-distance runners
United States Army soldiers
People from Uasin Gishu County
Kenyan emigrants to the United States
Alabama Crimson Tide men's track and field athletes
U.S. Army World Class Athlete Program